Faculty of Education, University of Cambridge is the School of Education at the University of Cambridge in Cambridge, United Kingdom. It was established in 2001. It is part of the school of humanities and social sciences at the University of Cambridge.

Courses at the school include undergraduate, masters and doctoral programmes, initial teacher education and training, and professional development studies:
  MPhil (full-time)
  Master of Education (part-time)
  PhD (full and part-time)
  EdD (part-time)
  Undergraduate Education BA
  Postgraduate Professional Development, including an accredited Counselling Programme
  Postgraduate Certificate in Education (PGCE)

Students at the Faculty of Education, University of Cambridge also join one of the Cambridge Colleges.

The faculty is situated on Hills road, near Homerton College.

History 

Faculty of Education, University of Cambridge was formed by the merger of three prior departments: the Institute of Education, the Department of Education (initially on Trumpington street) and the teaching interests of Homerton College. The new faculty building was designed by Building Design Partnership, and was opened in 2005 by Prince Philip. It was named the Donald McIntyre Building in 2009.

World university education subject rankings

Faculty of Education, University of Cambridge was ranked 4th in the world according to the QS World University Rankings in Education 2017.
However, in the 2014 UK Research Excellence Framework for Education, the faculty ranked 5th. The next REF report will be in 2021.

Research groups, interests and centres

Faculty of Education has a number of research groups, research interests and research teaching centres which bring together academics in a variety of fields. Some faculty researchers and initial teacher educators are partnered with the University of Cambridge Primary School, opened in 2015, which is the first of its kind.

The academic groups are:
 Education, Equality & Development
 Educational Leadership, Policy, Evaluation and Change
 Pedagogy, Language and Culture in Education
 Psychology & Education
 Science, Technology & Mathematics Education
The research interest groups include:
 Creativities and Arts
 Education and International Development
 Education Policy and Evaluation
 History, Philosophy and Sociology of Education
 Psychology and Education
 Teacher and Professional Education
 Teaching and Pedagogy
The research and teaching centres are:
 Education Reform and Innovation
 Centre for Children's Literature
 Leadership for Learning: the Cambridge Network
 PEDAL: Centre for Research on Play in Education, Development and Learning
 REAL: Research for Equitable Access and Learning

Previous research centres:
 Cambridge Primary Review Trust
 Centre for Commonwealth Education  (see also OER4Schools programme)

Notable academics
 Maria Nikolajeva, director, centre for children's literature
 Diane Reay
 Rex Walford, head of the then department of education in the 1990s

References

External links
 

Education, Faculty of
Educational institutions established in 2001
2001 establishments in England
Teacher training colleges in the United Kingdom
Building Design Partnership buildings